Saddleworth is a civil parish in the Metropolitan Borough of Oldham, Greater Manchester, England.  It lies between the town of Oldham and the Pennine hills, and it is largely rural, with agricultural land and moorland.  It also includes suburban areas to the east of Oldham.  The principal settlements are Austerlands, Delph, Denshaw, Diggle, Dobcross, Grasscroft, Greenfield, Grotton, Lydgate, Springhead, and Uppermill.  The parish contains 385 listed buildings that are recorded in the National Heritage List for England.  Of these, five are listed at Grade II*, the middle grade, and the others are at Grade II, the lowest grade.

Most of the listed buildings are houses and farmhouses, and many have been used as loom workshops and have windows with multiple lights.  Almost all the buildings are in stone and have roofs of stone-slate or slate, and the windows are mullioned.  The Huddersfield Narrow Canal runs through the parish, and the listed buildings associated with this are bridges, locks, a milestone, and an aqueduct.  The other listed buildings include farm buildings, churches and associated structures, village stocks, public houses, bridges, shops, a former mill, milestones, a boundary stone, tenter posts, a railway viaduct, two war memorials, three telephone kiosks, and two sets of pillboxes.

This listed contains the listed buildings dated from 1800.


Key

Buildings

See also

Listed buildings in Saddleworth to 1800

References

Citations

Sources

Lists of listed buildings in Greater Manchester
Buildings and structures in the Metropolitan Borough of Oldham
Listed